Gan Kim Yong (born 9 February 1959) is a Singaporean politician who has been serving as Minister for Trade and Industry since 2021. A member of the governing People's Action Party, he has been the Member of Parliament (MP) representing the Chua Chu Kang division of Chua Chu Kang GRC since 2011. 

Gan had previously served as Minister for Manpower between 2008 and 2011, Minister for Health between 2011 and 2021 and Chairman of the People's Action Party between 2018 and 2022. 

Prior to entering politics, Gan worked in the Ministry of Trade and Industry (MTI) and Ministry of Home Affairs (MHA). He joined NatSteel in 1989 and became the chief executive officer and president of NatSteel in 2005. 

Gan made his political debut in the 2001 general election as part of a five-member PAP team contesting in Holland–Bukit Panjang GRC and won by an uncontested walkover.

Education
Gan was educated at Catholic High School and National Junior College before he received an Overseas Merit Scholarship from the Singapore Government to study at the University of Cambridge, where he completed a Bachelor of Arts degree in electrical engineering in 1981. 

He subsequently went on to complete a masters degree in engineering at the University of Cambridge in 1985.

Career
Gan began his career in the Civil Service, working at the Ministry of Trade and Industry (MTI) and Ministry of Home Affairs (MHA). He left the Civil Service for the private sector in 1989 and joined NatSteel. In 1996, he became Executive Vice-President of NatSteel and CEO of NatSteel Resorts International and NatSteel Properties. In 2005, he became President and CEO of NatSteel.

Political career
Gan made his political debut in the 2001 general election as part of a five-member PAP team contesting in Holland–Bukit Panjang GRC and won by an uncontested walkover. Gan was subsequently elected as the Member of Parliament representing the Zhenghua ward of Holland–Bukit Panjang GRC. In 2005, he was appointed as Minister of State for Education and Minister of State for Manpower.

During the 2006 general election, Gan replaced Low Seow Chay as the PAP candidate contesting in Chua Chu Kang SMC and won 60.37% of the vote. On 1 April 2008, he was appointed as Acting Minister for Manpower and later promoted to full Minister on 1 April 2009.

During the 2011 general election, Gan led the five-member PAP team contesting in the newly-formed Chua Chu Kang GRC and won 61.20% of the vote. He continued serving as the Member of Parliament representing the Chua Chu Kang ward of Chua Chu Kang GRC. On 21 May 2011, he relinquished his portfolio as Minister for Manpower and took up a new portfolio as Minister for Health.

During the 2015 general election, Gan led the four-member PAP team contesting in Chua Chu Kang GRC and won 76.89% of the vote. On 23 November 2018, Gan succeeded Khaw Boon Wan as Chairman of the People's Action Party. 

In February 2018, Gan was appointed by the World Health Organization (WHO) to serve on the Commission on Non-Communicable Diseases, which aims to identify innovative ways to curb diseases that are not transmitted from person to person, such as diabetes, cancer and heart disease, and extend life expectancy.

During the 2020 general election, Gan led the five-member PAP team contesting in Chua Chu Kang GRC and won about 59% of the vote. During the COVID-19 pandemic in Singapore, Gan and Lawrence Wong were appointed co-chairs of a multi-ministerial committee set up by the government on 22 January 2020 to manage the situation. Following a Cabinet reshuffle, on 15 May 2021, Gan became Minister for Trade and Industry.

Personal life 
Gan is married with two daughters. He was also an elder at the Chen Li Presbyterian Church.

References

External links 

 Gan Kim Yong on Prime Minister's Office
 Gan Kim Yong on Parliament of Singapore

Members of the Cabinet of Singapore
Members of the Parliament of Singapore
Singaporean people of Hokkien descent
Singaporean Presbyterians
National Junior College alumni
Catholic High School, Singapore alumni
1959 births
Living people
Ministers for Manpower of Singapore
Ministers for Health of Singapore